The  is a mostly-underground rubber-tyred rapid transit system in Sapporo, Hokkaido, Japan. Operated by the Sapporo City Transportation Bureau, it is the only subway system on the island of Hokkaido.

Lines
The system consists of three lines: the green Namboku Line (North-South line), orange Tozai Line (East-West line), and blue Tōhō Line (North East Line). The first, the Namboku Line, was opened in 1971 prior to the 1972 Winter Olympics. The Sapporo City Subway system operates out of two main hubs: Sapporo Station and Odori Station. Most areas of the city are within a reasonable walking distance or short bus ride from one of the subway stations.

The three lines all connect at Odori Station and with the JR Hokkaido main lines at Sapporo Station. At Odori and Susukino stations, it connects to the streetcar (tram) above. The system has a total length of 48 km with 46 stations. Except for the section of the Namboku Line south of Hiragishi Station, the tracks and stations are underground; despite being aboveground, this section of the Namboku Line is entirely covered, including the stations, the depot access tracks, and the depot south of Jieitai-Mae Station.

Technology

All lines of the subway use rubber-tired trains that travel on two flat roll ways, guided by a single central rail. This system is unique among subways in Japan and the rest of the world; while other rubber-tired metro networks, including smaller automated guideway transit lines such as the Port Liner, use guide bars, the Sapporo system does not because the central rail makes them superfluous (similar to some rubber-tyred trams, such as the Translohr and Bombardier Guided Light Transit).

There are differences between the technology used on the older Namboku Line and the newer Tōzai and Tōhō Lines. The Namboku Line uses a T-shaped guide rail, double tires, and third rail power collection, while the Tōzai and Tōhō Lines use an I-shaped guide rail, single tires, and overhead line power collection. Also, the surface of the roll ways is either made up of resin (on the entirety of the Namboku Line and the central section of the Tōzai Line) or steel (on the outer sections of the Tōzai Line and the entirety of the Tōhō Line).

Rolling stock

Namboku Line
5000 series (6-car formation with 4 doors per side, since 1997)

Tōzai Line
8000/8300 series (7-car formation with 3 doors per side, since 1998)

Tōhō Line 
9000 series (4-car formation with 3 doors per side, since May 2015)

Former rolling stock

Namboku Line 

1000/2000 series (2/4/6/8-car formation with 2 doors per side, from 1971 until 1999)
3000 series (8-car formation with 2 doors per side, from 1978 until 2012)

Tōzai Line 
6000 series (7-car formation with 3 doors per side, from 1976 until 2008)

Tōhō Line 
 7000 series (4-car formation with 3 doors per side, from 1988 until 2016)

Rolling stock gallery

Fares
Ticket prices range from 200 yen to 360 yen, depending on the distance to travel. Day passes and discount passes can be purchased at the vending machines. Prepaid "With You" cards can be used for the subway, streetcar and regular city routes offered by JR Hokkaido Bus, Chuo Bus and Jotetsu Bus.

One-day Cards offer unlimited rides on the subway, streetcar, and regular city routes offered by the Chuo, Jotetsu, and JR Hokkaido Buses (excluding some suburban areas) on the day of purchase. A subway one-day card, for use only on the subway, is also available. Donichika-Tickets allow for unlimited one-day ride pass for the subway to be used only on Saturdays, Sundays and national holidays.

Commuter passes offer unlimited rides between specific stations during their period of validity. There are two types of commuter pass: one for those commuting to their workplace and one for students; both are available for one- or three-month periods, and can be purchased from commuter pass sales offices located at major stations. All stations accept the SAPICA rechargeable IC cards which can be used as a fare card for the subway.

Shopping areas
There are two main shopping areas located underground, connected to the exits of three central stations on the Namboku line: Sapporo Station, Susukino Station, and Odori Station. Pole Town is an extensive shopping area that lies between Susukino and Odori stations. Aurora Town is a shopping arcade that is connected to Sapporo station. It links some of the main shopping malls in Sapporo, such as Daimaru, JR Tower, Esta, and Stellar Place.

Network Map

References

External links

 Sapporo City Transportation Bureau 
 Sapporo Transportation Information 
 Sapporo at UrbanRail.net 

 
Transport in Sapporo
Organizations based in Sapporo
Underground rapid transit in Japan
750 V DC railway electrification
1500 V DC railway electrification
1971 establishments in Japan